George Arceneaux Jr. (May 17, 1928 – April 6, 1993) was a United States district judge of the United States District Court for the Eastern District of Louisiana.

Education and career

Born in New Orleans, Louisiana, Arceneaux received a Bachelor of Arts degree from Louisiana State University in 1949. He received a Juris Doctor from the Washington College of Law at American University in 1957. He was in the United States Army from 1951 to 1952. He was an administrative assistant to United States Senator Allen J. Ellender from 1952 to 1960. He was in private practice of law in Houma, Louisiana from 1960 to 1979.

Federal judicial service

Arceneaux was nominated by President Jimmy Carter on June 12, 1979, to the United States District Court for the Eastern District of Louisiana, to a new seat created by 92 Stat. 1629. He was confirmed by the United States Senate on September 25, 1979, and received his commission on September 26, 1979. His service was terminated on April 6, 1993, due to his death in Houma.

Notable case

In 1991, Arceneaux delivered the maximum sentence allowed on the conviction for multiple felonies of former Louisiana Insurance Commissioner Douglas D. "Doug" Green of Baton Rouge. Judge Arceneaux ordered Green to serve twenty-eight concurrent five-year terms on conviction of conspiracy and mail fraud and two concurrent 20-year terms for laundering campaign loans. A jury determined that Green conspired with John and Naaman Eicher of the Champion Insurance Company, his largest campaign donors, to keep the failing company intact, a decision which cost Louisiana taxpayers $150 million. According to prosecution evidence, Green received $2.7 million in bribes. Green ultimately served about half of his total 25-year sentence in the federal prison in Pensacola, Florida.

References

Sources
 

1928 births
1993 deaths
Louisiana State University alumni
Washington College of Law alumni
Judges of the United States District Court for the Eastern District of Louisiana
United States district court judges appointed by Jimmy Carter
20th-century American judges
United States Army soldiers
Louisiana Democrats
Lawyers from New Orleans
People from Houma, Louisiana
20th-century American lawyers